Jazireh-ye Minu Rural District is a rural district (dehestan) in Minu District, Khorramshahr County, Khuzestan Province, Iran. At the 2006 census, its population was 6,372, in 1,313 families.  The rural district has 30 villages.

References 

Rural Districts of Khuzestan Province
Khorramshahr County